Zodi (ზოდი) is a village in Chiatura municipality, Imereti, Georgia. It is located on the Chiatura plateau, 630 m above the sea level. There is a sand quarry, mineral water springs and several archaeological sites in the village. From the north, Zodi is bounded by river Tsikhistskali (ციხისწყალი), running through deep limestone canyons.

Reference 
 Georgian Soviet Encyclopedia, Vol. 4, Pg. 525, 1979.

Populated places in Chiatura Municipality